Cyclobacterium qasimii  is a horseshoe-shaped, psychrotolerant and non-motile bacterium from the genus of Cyclobacterium which has been isolated from marine sediments from Kongsfjorden in Svalbard.

References

External links
Type strain of Cyclobacterium qasimii at BacDive -  the Bacterial Diversity Metadatabase

Cytophagia
Bacteria described in 2012
Psychrophiles